Rena Buckley is an Irish sportswoman who played at senior level for both the Cork county ladies' football team and the Cork county camogie team. She has also represented 
Munster in the Gael Linn Cup and Ireland at international rules. Between 2005 and 2017 she won 18 All-Ireland winners medals, making her one of the most decorated sportspeople in Gaelic games. In 2012 she captained Cork when they won the All-Ireland Senior Ladies' Football Championship and in 2017 she captained Cork when they won the All-Ireland Senior Camogie Championship. She was the first player to captain Cork to both All-Ireland senior championships. She was also named as an All Star on eleven occasions. In 2015 Buckley and her team mate and fellow dual player, Briege Corkery, were named joint winners of the 2015 The Irish Times/ Sport Ireland Sportswoman of the Year Award.

Early years, family and education
Rena Buckley is the daughter of Tim and Ellen Buckley. Her hometown is Berrings, Inniscarra. Between 1999 and 2005 she attended St. Aloysius School in Cork. Between 2005 and 2009 she attended University College Dublin where she gained a BSc in Physiotherapy and Performance Science. In 2017–18 she returned to UCD and completed a MSc in Sports Physiotherapy. In 2019 she was awarded an  Honorary Doctorate by University College Cork. In 2015, she was awarded the UCD Alumni Award for Physiotherapy.

Playing career

Clubs
At club level Buckley plays ladies' Gaelic football for Donoughmore and camogie for Inniscarra. Between 2005 and 2009, while attending University College Dublin, she also played camogie and ladies football for UCD GAA and featured in four successive Ashbourne Cup finals, finishing on winning teams in 2007 and 2008. She was part of an O'Connor Cup winning team in 2006.

Inter-county

Ladies' Gaelic football
Between 2003 and 2017 Buckley played for the Cork county ladies' football team. Together with Valerie Mulcahy, Juliet Murphy and Briege Corkery she was a member of the Cork team that won eleven All-Ireland Senior Ladies' Football Championships between 2005 and 2016. In 2010 Buckley captained Cork when they won the Ladies' National Football League title  and in 2012 she was captain when they won the All-Ireland title. In the 2016 All-Ireland Senior Ladies' Football Championship Final she was named Player of the Match. In 2017 she retired from the Cork senior ladies' football team.

Camogie
Between 2004 and 2018 Buckley played for the Cork county camogie team. Together with Gemma O'Connor, Anna Geary, Ashling Thompson and Briege Corkery she was a member of the Cork team that won seven All-Ireland Senior Camogie Championships between 2005 and 2017. 
 She captained Cork when they won the 2017 All-Ireland Senior Camogie Championship Final. In 2018 Buckley announced she was retiring from the Cork senior camogie team.

All-Ireland Finals
Between 2005 and 2017, while playing for the Cork county ladies' football team and the Cork county camogie team, Buckley won 18 All-Ireland winners medals, making her one of the most decorated sportspeople in Gaelic games. In 2012 she captained Cork when they won the All-Ireland Senior Ladies' Football Championship and in 2017 she captained Cork when they won the All-Ireland Senior Camogie Championship. She was the first player to captain Cork to both All-Ireland championships and, after Mary Geaney, she became only the second player to captain a team to both All-Ireland championships. On six occasions she helped Cork win the Double, after they won both All-Ireland championships in the same year. In total she played in 22 All-Ireland finals. On four occasions she finished as a runner-up, all with the Cork senior camogie team. In 2015 Buckley and her team mate and fellow dual player, Briege Corkery, both broke the record for most individual All-Ireland medals, overtaking the 15 won by the Dublin camogie player, Kathleen Mills. In December 2015 Buckley and Corkery were named joint winners of the 2015 The Irish Times/ Sport Ireland Sportswoman of the Year Award in recognition of there achievement.

International rules football
Buckley was a member of the Ireland women's international rules football team that played against Australia in the 2006 Ladies International Rules Series.

Personal life
Buckley is a member of the Irish Society of Chartered Physiotherapists. In 2013 she became a partner in a physiotherapy centre in Muskerry, County Cork. Since September 2015 she has operated her own clinic in Macroom. Her clinic are the club physiotherapists for several local GAA clubs including Naomh Abán. In May 2021, Buckley married her longtime partner, the Freemount GAA player, Páidí Collins.

Honours

Ladies' Gaelic football
Cork
All-Ireland Senior Ladies' Football Championship
Winners: 2005, 2006, 2007, 2008, 2009, 2011, 2012, 2013, 2014, 2015, 2016: 11
Ladies' National Football League 
 2005, 2006, 2008, 2009, 2010, 2011, 2013, 2014, 2015, 2016, 2017: 11
RTÉ Sports Team of the Year Award 
 2014

Camogie
Cork
All-Ireland Senior Camogie Championship
Winners: 2005, 2006, 2008, 2009, 2014, 2015, 2017: 7
Runners-up: 2004, 2007, 2012, 2016: 4
National Camogie League
Winners: 2006, 2007, 2012: 3
UCD
Ashbourne Cup
Winners: 2007, 2008: 2
Runners-up: 2006, 2009: 2

Individual
The Irish Times/ Sport Ireland Sportswoman of the Year
 2015
Ladies' Gaelic Football All Stars Awards
Winner: 2004, 2006, 2007, 2011, 2012, 2015: 6
Camogie All Stars
Winner: 2006, 2007, 2014, 2015, 2017: 5

References

1987 births
Living people
Cork camogie players
Cork inter-county ladies' footballers
UCD camogie players
Dual camogie–football players
Ireland women's international rules football team players
Winners of four All-Ireland medals (ladies' football)
Alumni of University College Dublin
People associated with University College Cork
Irish physiotherapists